Metasphenisca hazelae is a species of tephritid or fruit flies in the genus Metasphenisca of the family Tephritidae. It is present in some areas of Africa.

Distribution
Ethiopia, South Africa.

References

Tephritinae
Insects described in 1947
Diptera of Africa